The Ladybug Transistor is an album by the Brooklyn indie pop band The Ladybug Transistor. It was released in 2003 by Merge Records.

Critical reception
The Encyclopedia of Popular Music wrote that "the blend of 70s-era AOR rock and wistful chamber pop helped make the album one of the year's most pleasant surprises." The Tucson Weekly called the album "the band's best record yet," writing that it "takes off with a flourish and spins through 13 songs played on 12-string guitars, keyboards, strings and horns."

Track listing
 "These Days In Flames"
 "In December"
 "3=Wild"
 "Song For The Ending Day"
 "Choking On Air"
 "The Places You'll Call Home"
 "Gospel"
 "Please Don't Be Long"
 "NY-San Anton"
 "Hangin' On The Line"
 "A Burial At Sea"
 "Splendor In The Grass"
 "The Last Gent"

Personnel 
 Gary Olson - vocals and trumpet
 Jeff Baron - guitar
 Sasha Bell - vocals, piano, organ and flute
 San Fadyl - drums
 Julia Rydholm - bass guitar and violin

References

2003 albums
The Ladybug Transistor albums
Merge Records albums